Heinrich von Gunterrodt was the author of a treatise on the art of fencing published in 1579 that was dedicated to the duke of Wittenberg, De veriis principiis artis dimicatoriae Tractatus brevis.

His book is the first to mention the treatise known today as I.33, which he claimed was written by a close friend of his, a beltmaker and celebrated swordsman called Johannes Herwart.

Historical fencing
Year of birth unknown
Year of death unknown